Lake Forest College is a private liberal arts college in Lake Forest, Illinois. Founded in 1857 as Lind University by a group of Presbyterian ministers, the college has been coeducational since 1876 and an undergraduate-focused liberal arts institution since 1903. Lake Forest enrolls approximately 1,500 students representing 43 states and 80 countries. Lake Forest offers 32 undergraduate major and minor programs in the humanities, social sciences, and natural sciences, and features programs of study in pre-law, pre-medicine, communication, business, finance, and computer science. The majority of students live on the college's wooded 107-acre campus located a half-mile from the Lake Michigan shore.

Lake Forest is affiliated with the Associated Colleges of the Midwest. The college has 23 varsity teams which compete in the NCAA Division III Midwest Conference.

History

Lake Forest College was founded in 1857 by Reverend Robert W. Patterson as a Presbyterian alternative to the Methodist Northwestern University in Evanston. It was originally named Lind University after Sylvester Lind, who had given $80,000 to launch the school. Patterson and his fellow Chicago Presbyterians established the town of Lake Forest and the university roughly halfway between Evanston and Waukegan two years after the Chicago and Milwaukee Railway began service from Chicago. They hired St. Louis landscape architect Almerin Hotchkiss to design the town of Lake Forest with a university park at its center. Hotchkiss used the area's wooded ravines and forest as guidelines to plat a park-like, curvilinear layout for the town.

Lake Forest Academy, a boys' preparatory school and the first project of the university, began offering classes in 1858; collegiate-level courses began in 1860. By the mid-1860s, a small New England-style village had been established with an academy building, a Presbyterian church and several homes. The school had a medical college from 1859 to 1863, which later split off and eventually became part of Northwestern University, now known as the Northwestern University Feinberg School of Medicine.

In 1865, the name became Lake Forest University. In 1869 Ferry Hall, a girls' preparatory school and junior college, opened as a division of the university. It later merged with Lake Forest Academy in 1974.

In 1876 Mary Eveline Smith Farwell started Lake Forest College, a coeducational division of the university, under the leadership of the Reverend Patterson. In 1878, College Hall (now Young Hall) was built following a fire that destroyed the former hotel being used for classes.

The Reverend James Gore King McClure arrived in Lake Forest in 1881 as the pastor of the Presbyterian Church. Under his influence over the next 50 years, the college experienced a large transition "from a pluralistic graduate and professional emphasis to a singular undergraduate liberal arts focus," says Lake Forest College archivist Art Miller, who co-wrote 30 Miles North: A History of Lake Forest College, Its Town, and Its City of Chicago. During this time, the college's theater group, the Garrick Players, the yearbook, and student newspaper, The Stentor, were all formed.

In 1890 Lake Forest established a relationship with the Chicago College of Dental Surgery, Chicago's first dental school, to serve as its dental department. This affiliation ended in 1902.

The Lake Forest School of Music opened as a division of the university in 1916, incorporating and extending the courses in music hitherto given in other departments. A summer school of landscape architecture was instituted in 1916.

By 1925, Lake Forest College split from Lake Forest Academy, and the school's only focus was on undergraduate liberal arts. Following World War II, the college experienced further growth, taking control of what is now South Campus and constructing the Alumni Memorial Fieldhouse.

In 1960, William Graham Cole, from Williams College, took over as president and brought with him Eastern faculty and students, further diversifying the campus. During his time as president, in 1965, the school's name was officially changed to Lake Forest College. In March 2010, the college received $7 million from alumna Grace Groner.

Faculty
The teaching faculty consists of 181 members. Lake Forest has a student-to-professor ratio of 12:1, and the average class size is 19. No classes at Lake Forest are taught by teaching assistants. Ninety-six percent of faculty hold a doctorate or equivalent degree. See list of Lake Forest College people for notable faculty. Lake Forest professors regularly include undergraduates in their primary research and supervise independent research projects.

Faculty members receive fellowships and grants from such notable organizations as the Fulbright Program, National Science Foundation, National Institutes of Health, National Endowment for the Humanities, Freeman Foundation, Mellon Foundation, MacArthur Foundation, Getty Trust, Goldsmith Foundation, and Kemper Foundation.

Academics 

Lake Forest's most popular undergraduate majors, by 2021 graduates, were:
Business/Commerce (62)
Research & Experimental Psychology (37)
Finance (24)
Econometrics & Quantitative Economics (21)
Neuroscience (19)
English Language & Literature (19)

Rankings 
 The Princeton Review
 2021: #4 "Best Science Lab Facilities," #9 "Best Counseling Services," #9 "Best Health Services," #14 "Top 20 Best Schools for Internships (Private Schools)"
 2019: #9 "Best Colleges for Internships," #12 "Best Alumni Network," #20 "Most Popular Study Abroad Program," #20 "Best College Library"
U.S. News & World Report
 2021: #2 "Top Performers on Social Mobility," #33 "Best Value Schools," #84 "National Liberal Arts Colleges"
 2019: #45 "Best Value School" 
Washington Monthly
 2020: #15 "Best Bang for the Buck," #37 "Best Liberal Arts Colleges"
2019: #39 "Best Bang for the Buck," #52 "Liberal Arts"

Admission
According to the Carnegie Foundation for the Advancement of Teaching and U.S. News & World Report, Lake Forest is considered to be a "more selective" institution, with a lower rate of transfer-in students.

Lake Forest College's admissions selectivity rank according to The Princeton Review is 88 out of 99. This ranking is determined by several institutionally-reported factors, including: the class rank, average standardized test scores, and average high school GPA of entering freshmen; the percentage of students who come from out-of-state; and the percentage of applicants accepted.

The acceptance rate for the Class of 2023 was 55% from a total applicant pool of 4,482, yielding a class of 400 students.

Student life
Approximately 1,500 students attend the college, and about 75% live on campus in one of the eleven residence halls. Lake Forest has more than 80 clubs and organizations, the largest and most active being: the student radio station (WMXM), Student Government, PRIDE (LGBTQ+), Student Programming Board (SPB) (organizes on-campus entertainment) and the Greek organizations.

Located 30 miles north of Chicago, Lake Forest College is roughly an hour's commute from the city. The Metra rail line, located in downtown Lake Forest, is a 15-minute walk from campus, where trains run approximately 25 times per day.

About 86% of students participate in off-campus internships and 40% participate in a study abroad program.

Center for Chicago Programs
At the Center for Chicago Programs, students can learn about events in the city and surrounding suburbs, get guidance on transportation to the city, and suggestions of where to go when they get there. The center also brings notable Chicago-area speakers, artists, and performers to campus.

Publications and media
There are six media organizations on campus:
 The Stentor is the school-sponsored student-run newspaper
The Stentor is published weekly and has been in publication since 1886. Online archives for twelve issues exist for the year 2011/2012.
 Tusitala, first printed in 1935, is the college's annual literary magazine
 Collage is a magazine featuring works primarily written in foreign languages
 Eukaryon is a life-science research journal publishing student work
 WMXM is a student-run radio station providing an alternative to mainstream radio
 Spectrum is a publication for faculty, staff, students, alumni and friends

Sororities
 Alpha Phi, Delta Delta Delta, Delta Gamma, Kappa Alpha Theta, Alpha Kappa Alpha and Gamma Phi Omega

Fraternities
 Delta Chi, Lambda Chi Alpha, Phi Beta Sigma and Alpha Tau Omega

Athletics
Lake Forest competes in Division III (except handball) and offers 23 varsity sports, 12 women's (basketball, cross country, distance indoor track, distance outdoor track, handball, ice hockey, soccer, softball, swimming and diving, tennis, golf, and volleyball) and 11 men's (basketball, cross country, distance indoor track, distance outdoor track,  football, handball, ice hockey, soccer, swimming and diving, golf and tennis). The handball teams have won 49 national championships and have received national media attention. The handball team competes in Division I through USHA (not NCAA).

Lake Forest College has been a member of the Midwest Conference since 1974. It was a member of the College Conference of Illinois and Wisconsin from 1946 to 1963, and of the Illinois Intercollegiate Athletic Conference from 1919 to 1937. Lake Forest College was present at the 1895 meeting that formed the now Division I Big Ten Conference, but did not join the conference.

The Sports Center, originally constructed in 1968, has long been home to Forester Athletics. But after the completion of a $17-million,  recreation and fitness addition, the building was renamed the Lake Forest College Sports and Recreation Center.

Outside of collegiate athletics, the campus is home to the original Halas Hall, the practice and front office facility for the NFL's Chicago Bears from 1977 until 1997. When the team built a new facility with the same name four miles to the west, the building was renovated into offices for the athletic department, while retaining the Halas Hall name. The practice field was renamed Farwell Field and serves as the main field for Foresters football and soccer.

Notable people

See also

References

Further reading
 Ebner, Michael H. "North Shore Town and Gown", Chicago History, Summer 2007, pp. 4–29
 Reed, Christopher and Arthur Miller. eds. Lake Forest College: A Guide to the Campus. Lake Forest College, 2007, bkstr.com

External links

 
 Official athletics website
 

 
1857 establishments in Illinois
Buildings and structures in Lake County, Illinois
Education in Lake County, Illinois
Educational institutions established in 1857
Lake Forest, Illinois
Liberal arts colleges in Illinois
Universities and colleges affiliated with the Presbyterian Church (USA)
Private universities and colleges in Illinois